Francisca Elisabeth "Elsemieke " Maria Havenga-Hillen (born 30 September 1959) is a Dutch retired field hockey forward, who won the gold medal at the 1984 Summer Olympics.

From 1978 to 1986 she played a total number of 106 international matches for Holland, in which she scored ten goals. Hillen retired after the 1986 Women's Hockey World Cup in Amstelveen, where the Dutch won the title. She later became a TV host for the newsbulletin of RTL 4.

References

External links
 

1959 births
Living people
Dutch television news presenters
Dutch television presenters
Dutch female field hockey players
Olympic field hockey players of the Netherlands
Field hockey players at the 1984 Summer Olympics
Field hockey players from The Hague
Olympic medalists in field hockey
Medalists at the 1984 Summer Olympics
Olympic gold medalists for the Netherlands
Women television journalists
Dutch women journalists
Dutch women television presenters
20th-century Dutch women